Dr. Jaswant Singh Yadav is an Indian politician. He was a Cabinet Minister for Skills Development, Labour and Employment, Factory and Boilers Inspection, ESI, ITI Minister in Rajasthan Government and a member of the Rajasthan Legislative Assembly representing the Behror Assembly constituency of Rajasthan. He belongs to the Bharatiya Janata Party.

According to his official biography, Yadav holds a Bachelor of Ayurveda, Medicine and Surgery (B.A.M.S.) degree.

He is also known as {tiger} in politics of rajasthan..

References 

Bharatiya Janata Party politicians from Rajasthan
1953 births
Living people
Rajasthani politicians
People from Alwar
India MPs 1999–2004
Lok Sabha members from Rajasthan
Rajasthan MLAs 2008–2013
Rajasthan MLAs 2013–2018